Luhandre Luus (Cape Town, 13 November 1995) is an South african-born Italian rugby union player.
His usual position is as a Hooker and he currently plays for Valorugby Emilia in Top12.

In 2017–18 Pro14 and 2018–19 Pro14 seasons, he played for Zebre in Pro 14.

After playing for Italy Under 20 in 2015, in 2016 and 2018 he also was named in the Emerging Italy squad.

References

External links 
It's Rugby England Profile
Eurosport Profile

South African rugby union players
Italian rugby union players
1995 births
Living people
Valorugby Emilia players
Rugby union hookers
Rugby Calvisano players
Zebre Parma players
South African people of Italian descent
Sportspeople from Paarl
Rugby union players from the Western Cape